"The Way to Your Love" is the second single from British pop group Hear'Say, the winners of the UK version of Popstars. The song was written and produced by Norwegian production team StarGate and was released as the second and final single from Hear'Say's debut studio album, Popstars (2001), on 25 June 2001.

"The Way to Your Love" debuted at number one on the UK Singles Chart with first-week sales of 75,514 copies. Despite the success of the group's debut single, "Pure and Simple", "The Way to Your Love" spent only one week at the top of the chart and sold only a tenth of their first record's sales; it was the second-lowest-selling number-one single of 2001 that did not reach number one in 2000.

Track listings
UK CD1
 "The Way to Your Love" (Jiant radio edit)
 "Look Inside Yourself"
 "Pure and Simple" (Jewels & Stone remix)
 "The Way to Your Love" (video CD ROM)

UK CD2
 "The Way to Your Love" (Jiant radio edit)
 "Boogie Wonderland"
 "Brand New Day"

UK cassette single
 "The Way to Your Love" (Jiant radio edit)
 "Pure and Simple" (karaoke version)

Credits and personnel
Credits are lifted from the Popstars album booklet.

Studios
 Recorded and mixed at StarGate Studios (Norway)
 Mastered at Transfermation (London, England)

Personnel
 StarGate – production
 Mikkel SE – writing, all instruments
 Hallgeir Rustan – writing, all instruments
 Tor Erik Hermansen – writing, all instruments
 Hear'Say – all vocals
 Richard Dowling – mastering

Charts

Weekly charts

Year-end charts

Certifications

References

External links
Official music video on MUZU.TV

2001 singles
2001 songs
Hear'Say songs
Number-one singles in Scotland
Polydor Records singles
Song recordings produced by Stargate (record producers)
Songs written by Hallgeir Rustan
Songs written by Mikkel Storleer Eriksen
Songs written by Tor Erik Hermansen
UK Singles Chart number-one singles